This is a list of Avid DNxHD resolutions, mainly available in multiple HD encoding resolutions based on the frame size and frame rate of the media being encoded.  The list below shows the available encoding choices for each of the available frame size and frame rate combinations.

Its sister codec, Avid DNxHR, supports resolutions beyond FullHD.

1080

1080p60

1080p59.94

1080p50

1080i59.94

1080p29.97

1080i50

1080p25

1080p24

1080p23.97

720

720p59.94

720p50

720p29.97

720p25

720p23.97

References 

Technology-related lists
Video codecs